The Europe and Africa Zone is one of the three zones of regional Davis Cup competition in 2012.

In the Europe and Africa Zone there are four different groups in which teams compete against each other to advance to the next group.

Draw

 and  promoted to Group I in 2013.

First round

Ukraine vs. Monaco

Cyprus vs. Morocco

Hungary vs. Ireland

Latvia vs. Egypt

Moldova vs. Belarus

Turkey vs. Bosnia and Herzegovina

Luxembourg vs. Estonia

Madagascar vs. Poland

Second round

Ukraine vs. Cyprus

Hungary vs. Latvia

Belarus vs. Bosnia and Herzegovina

Estonia vs. Poland

Play-offs

Monaco vs. Morocco

Ireland vs. Egypt

Moldova vs. Turkey

Madagascar vs. Luxembourg

Third round

Ukraine vs. Latvia

Belarus vs. Poland

References

External links
Draw Results

Europe/Africa Zone Group II